Night Parade is a 1929 American pre-Code drama film directed by Malcolm St. Clair based on the play Ringside by Hyatt Daab, Edward Paramore, Jr. and George Abbott. Released by RKO Pictures in October 1929, it starred Hugh Trevor, Aileen Pringle, Dorothy Gulliver and Robert Ellis.

Plot
Bobby Murray is the middleweight champion, managed by his father, Tom.  He is expected to lose an upcoming fight in defense of his title.  A local sportswriter, Sid Durham, also thinks he will lose, but he has high regard for Tom.  A gangster, John Zelli, also feels that Murray will lose, but wants to ensure that fact.  Zelli enlists the talents of sultry Paula Vernoff to seduce Bobby, and get him to agree to throw the fight.

Over the course of several meetings between Paula and Bobby, she eventually, through seduction and alcohol, gets him to agree to purposely lose.  Durham, through his connections, learns of Zelli's plot, and tells Tom what Bobby agreed to.  Tom confronts Bobby, who confesses, after which he learns that a childhood friend, Doris O'Connell, who he always had feelings for, also has feelings for him.

Unsure of what to do, Bobby goes to the fight.  Meanwhile, his father, Tom, goes to have a little meeting with Zelli, and makes sure that Zelli won't bother Bobby again.  As the fight progresses, Bobby is on the verge of losing.  But as he is knocked to the canvas a last time, he sees his father and Doris arrive ringside, giving him the courage to get up and win the fight.

Cast
Aileen Pringle as Paula Vernoff
Hugh Trevor as Bobby Martin
Dorothy Gulliver as Doris O'Connell
Robert Ellis as John W. Zelli
Ann Pennington as Dancer
Lloyd Ingraham as Tom Murray
Lee Shumway as Sid Durham
Charles Sullivan (actor) as Huffy

Notes
The film was also released by RKO as a silent film.

The film was known as Sporting Life in Great Britain, and La Più Bella Vittoria in Italy.

References

External links

1929 films
1920s sports drama films
American boxing films
American sports drama films
American black-and-white films
1920s English-language films
American films based on plays
Films directed by Malcolm St. Clair
RKO Pictures films
1929 drama films
1920s American films